The 31st Arizona State Legislature, consisting of the Arizona State Senate and the Arizona House of Representatives, was constituted in Phoenix from January 1, 1973, to December 31, 1974, during the last two years of Jack Williams' third term as Governor of Arizona. Both the Senate and the House membership remained constant at 30 and 60, respectively. The Republicans maintained their 18–12 edge in the upper house, while they increased their lead in the lower house to 38–22.

Sessions
The Legislature met for two regular sessions at the State Capitol in Phoenix. The first opened on January 11, 1973, and adjourned on May 9; while the second convened on January 14, 1974, and adjourned on May 10. There were two Special Sessions, the first of which convened on October 22, 1973, and adjourned on February 19, 1974; the second convened on June 26, 1974, at 9:00 am and adjourned sine die at 4:09 pm on the same day.

State Senate

Members

The asterisk (*) denotes members of the previous Legislature who continued in office as members of this Legislature.

House of Representatives

Members 
The asterisk (*) denotes members of the previous Legislature who continued in office as members of this Legislature.

References

Arizona legislative sessions
1973 in Arizona
1974 in Arizona
1973 U.S. legislative sessions
1974 U.S. legislative sessions